Sparadok Point (‘Nos Sparadok’ \'nos spa-ra-'dok\) is a sharp ice-free point projecting 200 m from the coast of Byers Peninsula on Livingston Island in the South Shetland Islands, Antarctica with a shingle spit extending further 300 m northwards into Barclay Bay.  It is surmounted by Tsamblak Hill. The area was visited by early 19th century sealers.

The point is named after the Thracian King Sparadok, 445-435 BC.

Location
British mapping in 1968, Spanish in 1992 and Bulgarian in 2005, 2009 and 2017.

Maps
 Península Byers, Isla Livingston. Mapa topográfico a escala 1:25000. Madrid: Servicio Geográfico del Ejército, 1992.
 L.L. Ivanov et al. Antarctica: Livingston Island and Greenwich Island, South Shetland Islands. Scale 1:100000 topographic map. Sofia: Antarctic Place-names Commission of Bulgaria, 2005.
 L.L. Ivanov. Antarctica: Livingston Island and Greenwich, Robert, Snow and Smith Islands. Scale 1:120000 topographic map.  Troyan: Manfred Wörner Foundation, 2009.

References
 Sparadok Point. SCAR Composite Gazetteer of Antarctica.
 Bulgarian Antarctic Gazetteer. Antarctic Place-names Commission. (details in Bulgarian, basic data in English)

External links
 Sparadok Point. Copernix satellite image

Headlands of Livingston Island
Bulgaria and the Antarctic